The Harvest of Hate is a 1929 American silent Western film directed by Henry MacRae and written by George H. Plympton and Gardner Bradford. The film stars Rex the Wonder Horse, Jack Perrin, Helen Foster, Tom London and Starlight the Horse. The film was released on August 4, 1929, by Universal Pictures.

Plot

Cast    
 Rex the Wonder Horse as Rex
 Jack Perrin as Jack Merritt
 Helen Foster as Margie Smith
 Tom London as Martin Trask
 Starlight the Horse as Starlight

References

External links
 

1929 films
1929 Western (genre) films
Universal Pictures films
Films directed by Henry MacRae
American black-and-white films
Silent American Western (genre) films
Films with screenplays by George H. Plympton
1920s English-language films
1920s American films